Nair-san may refer to:
 A. M. Nair, Indian freedom fighter
 Nair-san (film), film based on him